Critter may refer to:
 Critter (chess), a Slovak chess engine
 Critters (cellular automaton)
 Critters (comics), an anthology comic book published by Fantagraphics Books
 Critters (film series)
 Critters (film), the first film in the series
 Fearsome critters, legendary monsters said to live in North America
 The Critters, an American pop group
 The mascot and call sign of ValuJet Airlines
 A fan of the popular Dungeons and Dragons series Critical Role
 "The Critter", a Chinese pangolin

See also
 Little Critter, a series of children's books by Mercer Mayer